Kenneth Charles Easton (1924 – 8 February 2001), was a general practitioner, who in 1945 while studying medicine at Westminster Hospital, assisted at Bergen-Belsen concentration camp as a voluntary medical student. His career later was focussed around the development of prehospital care and emergency medicine.

References

20th-century British medical doctors
London medical students who assisted at Belsen
1945 in medicine
1924 births
2001 deaths